Helge Hagberg was a Swedish footballer. Hagberg made twenty Svenska Serien and Allsvenskan appearances for Djurgården and scored zero goals.

References

Swedish footballers
Djurgårdens IF Fotboll players
Svenska Serien players
Allsvenskan players
Association footballers not categorized by position
Year of birth missing
Year of death missing